This is a discography for the rock band Crowded House. As of 2021 Crowded House have sold over 15 million albums worldwide.

This discography relates to releases by Crowded House only. See Neil Finn's discography, Tim Finn's discography, Split Enz discography and The Finn Brothers' discography for other related works.

Albums

Studio albums

Live albums

Compilation albums

Video albums

Notes:
 ^ Farewell to the World was released on VHS and re-released on DVD in 2006.

Singles

Notes:
A ^ "Now We're Getting Somewhere" was released in New Zealand after "Don't Dream It's Over" and "Something So Strong" in 1987.
B ^ "Never Be the Same" charted on US Mainstream Rock Tracks due to radio airplay; it was not released as a proper single in the US.
C ^ "To the Island" (Tame Impala Remix) did not enter the NZ Top 40 Singles Chart, but peaked at number 36 on the NZ Hot Singles Chart.

Other charted songs

Other contributions
The Acoustic Album (2006, Virgin) – "Weather with You"
Music from the Home Front (2020, Bloodlines Records) – ""Don't Dream It's Over""

Crowded House song covers
 In 1991, Antonello Venditti re-arranged the song "Don't Dream It's Over", writing new lyrics instead of translating the original song, and naming it "Alta Marea", on the album Benvenuti in Paradiso. 
 In 1991, British performer Paul Young covered "Don't Dream It's Over" as a duet with Paul Carrack.
 In 1996, Belinda Carlisle covered "She Goes On" as "He Goes On" on her album A Woman and a Man.
 In 1997, British punk band China Drum covered "Fall at Your Feet" on their album Fiction of Life 2.
 In 1999, Australian Aboriginal singer Jimmy Little recorded a cover version of "Into Temptation" for a rock-indie covers album entitled Messenger.
 In 2000, Nuevo Flamenco musician Jesse Cook closed the album Free Fall with a cover of "Fall at Your Feet".
 In 2000, Belgian band Clouseau released a single of their cover of "Weather with You".
 In 2002, Sixpence None the Richer covered "Don't Dream It's Over" for their 2002 album Divine Discontent.
 In 2004, Busted performed a cover version of "Fall at Your Feet" as a B-side to the single "Who's David?"
 In 2005, She Will Have Her Way, a cover album by a variety of female artists, was released featuring versions of Neil and Tim Finn songs from Crowded House, Split Enz, and the brothers' solo careers. A limited edition has a second disc which contains the original versions of the tracks. The Crowded House tracks included are:
 "Better Be Home Soon" by Kasey Chambers
 "Distant Sun" by Brooke Fraser
 "Don't Dream It's Over" by Sarah Blasko
 "Fall at Your Feet" by Clare Bowditch
 "Four Seasons" by New Buffalo (originally "Four Seasons in One Day")
 "Into Temptation" by Renée Geyer
 "Not the Girl You Think You Are" by Holly Throsby
 "Pineapple Head" by Natalie Imbruglia
 In 2005, James Blunt performed a cover version of "Fall at Your Feet" as a B-side to the single "You're Beautiful".
 In 2005, Howie Day performed a cover of "Don't Dream It's Over" for his live album Live From....
 In 2005, Patrizio Buanne covered the song "Alta Marea" by Antonello Venditti, which is a re-arrangement of the song "Don't Dream It's Over" with different lyrics, for his debut album The Italian.
 In 2006, Jimmy Buffett covered "Weather with You" for his album, Take the Weather with You.
 In 2006, Teddy Thompson covered "Don't Dream it's Over" for the compilation album, Q Covered: The Eighties.
 In 2008, Melbourne band The Resignators covered "Now We're Getting Somewhere" on their album Time Decays.

Covers performed by Crowded House
Crowded House themselves frequently perform a version of the Hunters and Collectors' "Throw Your Arms Around Me" and Paul Kelly's "Leaps and Bounds" during their live sets (including at the ARIA Music Awards of 1997 ceremony, inducting Kelly into the Hall of Fame). Their version of The Zombies' "She's Not There" was used on the soundtrack of The Crossing, a 1990 film starring Russell Crowe. In addition to these, the group often would perform The Beatles' "Rocky Raccoon", among many other Beatles songs. The group would also often perform Irish folk traditional piece "The Parting Glass". As the group rose from the ashes of Split Enz, they often performed various Split Enz songs, in particular "This Is Massive" because it was written by Paul Hester for Split Enz's last album, the only studio album he performed on.

References

Discography
Discographies of Australian artists
Crowded House